ODAC may refer to:

 Oil Depletion Analysis Centre, an independent UK-registered educational charity
 Old Dominion Athletic Conference, a collegiate athletics conference in the southeastern United States
 Oncologic Drugs Advisory Committee
  Oracle Data Access Components - tools for Oracle databases